Abdur Raqib Ali (born 18 November 1947) is a former Pakistani first-class cricketer who was born in India. A proflic slow left-arm orthodox bowler, Raqib took 643 wickets in his career which last over 20 years.

References
 Cricket Archive

1947 births
Living people
Pakistani cricketers
Karachi cricketers
Sindh cricketers
Habib Bank Limited cricketers
Public Works Department cricketers
Karachi Greens cricketers
Karachi Whites cricketers
Karachi Blues cricketers
Karachi University cricketers
Sind A cricketers
National Tyre and Rubber Company cricketers
Sportspeople from Gorakhpur
Cricketers from Karachi
Muhajir people